Mingyi Swa of Prome (1435–1482) was viceroy of Prome from 1446 to 1482 during the reigns of kings Narapati I, Thihathura I and Minkhaung II of Ava.

Brief
He was born Min Hsin-Mya (မင်းဆင်များ or မင်းဆင်မြား) to Viceroy Thihathu of Prome and his chief queen Atula Thiri Maha Yaza Dewi in Prome (Pyay). He was probably born  1435. He was the fourth of the couple's eight children. He had one elder brother, two elder sisters, one younger brother and three younger sisters. In April 1442, the family moved to Ava (Inwa) when Thihathu succeeded the Ava throne as Narapati I of Ava.

His stay at Ava was short. In January 1446, Narapati I appointed his second son, then no older than 11 years of age, the viceroy of Prome, the second most important city in the kingdom. He was a loyal son throughout his father's 26-year reign. But in 1472, he tried to revolt against his elder brother King Thihathura I by getting into a league with his younger brother Thado Minsaw, governor of Tharrawaddy. But the planned rebellion never panned out and both brothers submitted to the king in February 1473. Thihathura forgave his brothers and appointed them to their former position. He gave no more trouble when his nephew Minkhaung II became king of Ava in 1480. In return, the new king kept Mingyi Swa at his post.

Swa died in 1482. Thado Minsaw of Tharrawaddy seized Prome, and revolted against Minkhaung II. The rebellion succeeded, and Prome became independent.

Family
Swa and his principal wife Saw Myat Lay had 11 children (four sons and seven daughters). He was also married to the daughter of Minye Kyawhtin of Toungoo and Princess of Yamethin.

Ancestry

Notes

References

Bibliography
 
 
 
 

Ava dynasty
1482 deaths
1430s births